Ashmanhaugh is a village and civil parish in the English county of Norfolk, situated some 20 km north east of Norwich. See Inside the churches of St Swithins here & Beeston St Lawrence here.  Apart from Ashmanhaugh village itself, the parish also includes Beeston St Lawrence, which was a separate parish until 1935.

The village name derives from 'Sailor's/pirate's enclosure' or perhaps, 'Aescmann's enclosure'.

The civil parish has an area of 4.82 square kilometres and in the 2001 census had a population of 197 in 74 households, the population falling to 189 at the 2011 census. For the purposes of local government, the parish falls within the district of North Norfolk.

The churches of Ashmanhaugh St Swithin and Beeston St Lawrence are two of 124 existing round-tower churches in Norfolk.

War Memorial
St. Swithin's Church holds a plaque commemorating Ashmanhaugh's war dead from the First World War which are listed as:
 Lance-Sergeant George Townshend (1895-1916), 9th Battalion, Royal Norfolk Regiment
 Private Ronald S. Bird (1894-1917), 1st Battalion, Royal Norfolk Regiment
 Private George Riches (1887-1918), 9th Battalion, Royal Norfolk Regiment
 Private H. William Riches (1883-1916), 12th Battalion, East Yorkshire Regiment

References

 Vision of Britain. Ashmanhaugh CP/AP Norfolk through time. Retrieved 4 December 2005.
 Office for National Statistics & Norfolk County Council, 2001. Census population and household counts for unparished urban areas and all parishes. Retrieved 2 December 2005.
http://kepn.nottingham.ac.uk/map/place/Norfolk/Ashmanhaugh

External links

Ashmanhaugh St Swithin's on the European Round Tower Churches Website
Beeston St Lawrence's on the European Round Tower Churches Website
Information from Genuki Norfolk on Ashmanhaugh.

Villages in Norfolk
Civil parishes in Norfolk
North Norfolk